Convent of Jesus and Mary, popularly known as CJM Waverley, is a boarding school in Mussoorie, India. It was founded in 1845 by the Religious of Jesus and Mary, Mussoorie Education Society. It is a residential school for the girls and is the oldest girls-only boarding school in the country. It is at an elevation of 6,600 feet above sea level.
CJM Waverley is recognized by the Government of Uttarakhand and is affiliated to the Central Board of Secondary Education (CBSE).

History
Convent of Jesus and Mary, Waverley, was established on 18 September 1845, by the religious of Jesus and Mary. The school is a recognised Christian Minority Institution, affiliated to the CBSE. Situated at an elevation of 6,600 feet above sea level, this exclusive, all girls residential and day school, holds pride of place in the small hill station of Mussoorie, in the North Indian state of Uttarakhand. Nestled among pines and deodars, away from the hustle and bustle of city life, CJM Waverley, provides the perfect ambience for a child's all round development. Managed by the devoted and selfless Sisters of the Religious of Jesus and Mary, the school is home to 350 boarders and 250 day scholars from classes I to XII. The school is staffed with the most experienced and qualified personnel, who are dedicated to nurturing the future leaders of tomorrow. Waverley provides the perfect environment for young girls to gain knowledge, experience, confidence, exposure and moral values. The school is equipped with state of the art facilities and all modern amenities to allow the girls to thrive in a secure and comfortable abode.

Houses
The pupils attending the school have been designated Houses. All the Houses have a House Captain who is assisted by a Vice-Captain. The Houses are:

Endurance (Yellow House)
Endeavour (Red House)
Encounter (Green House)
Enterprise (Blue House)

Curriculum and Extracurricular activities

CJM Waverley is an English medium school affiliated to the Central Board of Secondary Education, with classes from Class I to Class XII. Common subjects taught are English, Hindi, Sanskrit, mathematics, science (physics, chemistry and biology), history, civics, geography, art, craft, singing, computer education, catechism/moral formation, physical education, general knowledge, Indian dancing and classical music. Through the courses, social and civic duties of loyal citizen are emphasized.

Physical education

 Physical Training Games and Sports are compulsory activities not the School Curriculum.
 No child will be exempted from Physical Training or Games unless a Medical Certificate is produced, even when an exemption is granted, the child must attend the above classes.
 The Games Referee is the sole authority on the Referee Field and her/his decision is always final.
 Habitual lack of punctuality, disobedience to the Referee or Games Captains or bad spirit displayed on the play field is sufficient reason to suspend a player from games and if the offence is serious, the player will be disqualified from the Inter-house or Inter-School Matches.

Dance and music

Dance is a subject in all classes. Students learn various classical and contemporary dance forms. They show their skills in various cultural programmes at the school and interschool level.

Music is an important part of the curriculum. The girls learn Hindi and English singing. They also learn a variety of Indian and Western instruments. Girls are free to choose an instrument that they would like to learn from the various Indian and Western music instructors. The school offers lessons in the instruments including sitar, harmonium, tabla, violin, guitar, piano, drums and synthesizer. Girls get many chances to show their talent at school functions and inter school cultural fests.

Extra-curricular activities
The school also have a number of co-curricular and extra-curricular activities. Debates, declamation, elocution, extempore, story-telling, dramatics etc. are conducted both in the English and Hindi languages.

Clubs
The students of classes V to XII are also divided into various clubs including:

The Literary Club
The Science Club
The Social Service Club
The Ecology Club

Formation lessons
Students are given the classes for moral education. It helps to learn them the true values.

Notable alumni

Suvarna Jha – Model and actress
Priyanka Gill – British fashion journalist, entrepreneur and angel investor
Pema Chagzoetsang – Member of the Tibetan Parliament in-exile
Malvika Mehra - Indian advertising and design professional. Founder and former Creative Director of Tomorrow Creative Lab. Chief Creative Officer, Dentsu India.
Shruti Sharma - Shruti Sharma is an Indian model, beauty pageant contestant and actress. She was the first runner up and winner of Miss India World title at the 2002 Femina Miss India pageant. She represented India at the 2002 Miss World pageant held at London and made it to the semi-finals.

See also
 Convent of Jesus and Mary

References

Catholic boarding schools in India
Girls' schools in Uttarakhand
Christian schools in Uttarakhand
Boarding schools in Uttarakhand
Mussoorie
1845 establishments in India
Educational institutions established in 1845